Basic leucine zipper transcription factor, ATF-like 2 is a protein that, in humans, is encoded by the BATF2 gene.

References

Further reading

Proteins